A carvery is a pub or a restaurant where cooked meat is freshly sliced to order for customers, sometimes offering unlimited servings in a buffet style for a fixed price. The term is most commonly used in the United Kingdom, Ireland, Cyprus, and Commonwealth countries like Canada and Australia, but it is also found in the United States.

Description 
Carveries are often found in pubs and hotels, and are particularly commonly held at weekends, when they offer traditional Sunday roasts to a potentially large number of people. The meat is usually accompanied by a choice of potato (boiled, mashed and roasted), stuffing, and vegetables (commonly including carrots, parsnips, peas and other traditional British vegetables). Also provided are gravy and a sauce considered a traditional accompaniment to the various meats (for example, mint sauce to accompany roast lamb, apple sauce to accompany roast pork and so on).

Examples

Carveries existed as early as 1956 in London, in two Lyons Corner Houses.  One of the restaurants, in each of the Strand and the Tottenham Court Road Lyons, was a carvery.  They provided a three-course meal with beverage, but all but the carvery items were served by a Nippy (waitress).  Even the carvery table had an employee to help those having difficulty in the actual carving.  The price at this time was five shillings.

In the 1970s and later, many more carveries appeared in London. One well-known carvery was situated in the Regent Palace Hotel.  The restaurant there was on the ground floor, the Art Deco ceiling of which has been reassembled in the new Air W1 building.

Later they were operated by pub chains such as Harvester, Brewer's Fayre and Beefeater.  The Toby Carvery brand took over many former Beefeater sites.

The chain of Fuzzy's Grub in London is a noted carvery, being voted "Best Traditional British Restaurant, but all but the carv in London" in Harden's 2007 guide. 
Carvery food is now very popular and is now found in the whole of the UK.

United States 
Some restaurants in the US use the term or concept, and it is a staple at some buffets. Examples include:
 The House of Prime Rib, a prime rib carvery in San Francisco, California
 The Sign of the Beefcarver, a carvery chain in Michigan

See also

 Rodízio, a style of service where the server cuts meat from a skewer at the table

References

Restaurants by type
Serving and dining
Buffet restaurants